Mattia Sanzone (born 19 November 1997) is an Italian football player. He plays as a defender.

Club career

Rende 
On 19 December 2015, Sanzone made his debut in Serie D as a substitute replacing Gennaro Mallamaci in the 88th minute of a 2–0 away defeat against Siracusa. On 17 January 2016 he played his first entire match in Serie D, a 1–1 away draw against Città di Gragnano. In his second season Sanzone played 34 matches, all as a starter and he helped the team to reach the promotion in Serie C. On 30 July 2017 he played his first match in Coppa Italia, a 2–1 away defeat after extra-time against Padova in the first round, he played the entire match. On 26 August he made his professional debut in Serie C in a 1–0 home win over Reggina, he played the entire match.

Monopoli
On 31 January 2019, he signed with Monopoli.

Career statistics

Club

References

External links 
 

1997 births
Sportspeople from the Province of Cosenza
Footballers from Calabria
Living people
Italian footballers
S.S. Monopoli 1966 players
Serie C players
Serie D players
Association football defenders